Malanzán is a small town and municipality in La Rioja Province in northwestern Argentina.

References

Populated places in La Rioja Province, Argentina